Frontier Oil was an energy company, originally based in Canada, that moved to the United States.  Its headquarters were located in Houston, TX, and its subsidiary company, Frontier Refining & Marketing, Inc., is located in Denver, Colorado. Frontier's primary products were gasoline, diesel, and asphalt, and were marketed in the Rocky Mountain and Plains States.

Frontier Oil owned refineries in Cheyenne, Wyoming and El Dorado, Kansas.

Frontier merged with Holly Corporation in 2011 to form HollyFrontier Corporation.

History
The company was incorporated in Ontario in 1949 as Wainwright Refineries Limited, changing its names to Wainwright Producers & Refiners Limited in 1953, to Wainoco Oil and Chemicals Ltd. in 1966, and to Wainoco Oil Ltd. in 1971. In 1976 it became Wainoco Oil Corporation on its move to Wyoming in the United States. It changed its name to Frontier Oil in 1996.

On November 7, 2007, Frontier announced that the third quarter of 2007 had been the most profitable in the company's history.  They reported a total income of US$137,200,000 for the quarter, and $432,700,000 for the year to that point.

Frontier merged with Holly Corporation effective as of July 1, 2011 to form HollyFrontier Corporation.

See also

 List of oil refineries

References

External links
 Frontier Oil website
 Crude pipelines serving Frontier's refineries

Companies formerly listed on the New York Stock Exchange
Automotive fuel retailers
Defunct oil companies of the United States
Energy companies established in 1949
Companies based in Houston
Cheyenne, Wyoming
Butler County, Kansas
Non-renewable resource companies established in 1949
1949 establishments in Ontario
Non-renewable resource companies disestablished in 2011
Energy companies disestablished in 2011
2011 mergers and acquisitions
Canadian companies established in 1949